Lasiophrys latifrons is a species of beetle in the family Cerambycidae, and the only species in the genus Lasiophrys. It was described by Gahan in 1901.

References

Astathini
Beetles described in 1901
Monotypic beetle genera